GNR No. 533 was a locomotive of the British Great Northern Railway, built by Patrick Stirling in 1876. A larger boiler was fitted in 1891 making the locomotive a member of the GNR G2 class. Withdrawn from rolling service in June 1905, a crane was fitted to the locomotive and it was released for work at the Doncaster Works in March 1906. It carried no number but was lettered "DONCASTER WORKS". Duties at Doncaster included both heavy lifting and general shunting.

At about the time of grouping the "Big Four" on 1923, the large wheels on the crane broke, and the crane fell into a disuse. The entire engine was condemned in November 1928 to be replaced by a J54 tank engine.

During its life, this engine carried a number of different boilers. Most were domeless, but an Ivatt domed boiler from a member of the C12 class was fitted. This boiler was 15 inches longer. No known pictures exist showing how this extra length was accommodated.

External links
 LNER Encyclopedia No.533 crane tank

Crane Tank
Railway locomotives introduced in 1906
Scrapped locomotives